Blanka Isielonis (born 22 May 1978) is a Polish snowboarder. She competed in the women's parallel giant slalom event at the 2006 Winter Olympics.

References

1978 births
Living people
Polish female snowboarders
Olympic snowboarders of Poland
Snowboarders at the 2006 Winter Olympics
Sportspeople from Kraków
21st-century Polish women